Maja Berezowska  (13 April 1893 or 1898, in Baranowicze – 31 May 1978, in Warsaw) was a Polish painter.

Berezowska was born in Baranowicze, in the Minsk Governorate of the Russian Empire (present-day Belarus), to Polish parents Edmund Berezowski, who was an engineer and general, and Janina Berezowska née Przecławska. She studied in Saint Petersburg, Kraków and Munich.

From 1933 to 1936 she lived in Paris and worked with magazines such as "Le Figaro", "Le Rire" and "Ici Paris". She made a few caricature cartoons of Adolf Hitler which resulted in the official protest of the German Embassy in Paris, which sued Berezowska. She appeared in court but escaped having to pay any fine. However, Nazi Germans remembered her "outrage". After her return to Poland and the outbreak of World War II she was imprisoned at Pawiak, and later - with the death sentence - sent and imprisoned in the Ravensbrück concentration camp. After the liberation of the Ravensbrück camp by the Soviet forces she left, with a group of other Polish women, first for Stockholm and a year later, in 1946, returned to her native Poland and settled in Warsaw.

External links
 Caricature Museum, Warsaw
 Maja Berezowska 1956

1890s births
1978 deaths
People from Baranavichy
People from Novogrudsky Uyezd
20th-century Polish painters
20th-century Polish women artists
Ravensbrück concentration camp survivors
Burials at Powązki Cemetery